Our Doctor is the Best (German: Unser Doktor ist der Beste) is a 1969 West German comedy film directed by Harald Vock and starring Roy Black, Helga Anders and Peter Weck.

The film's sets were designed by the art director Karl Schneider.

Cast
 Roy Black as Dr. Leonhard Sommer 
 Helga Anders as Loni Vogt 
 Peter Weck as Studienrat Zackgiebel 
 Christiane Schmidtmer as Frau Janssen 
 Joachim Hansen as Professor Frederik Janssen 
 Corinna Genest as Oberschwester Hildegart 
 Petra Esser as Monika Kosel 
 Gerhard Acktun as Hotte 
 Wilma Landkroon as Wilma 
 Maria Brockerhoff as Freundin von Frau Janssen 
 Gerhart Lippert as Dr. Walter Moll 
 Max Mairich as Schuldirektor 
 Edda Seippel as Eva-Maria Klarwein 
 Käthe Haack as Alma Carisius 
 Sissy Löwinger as Krankenschwester 
 Helga Weigmann as Walters Freundin 
 Karin Heske as Krankenschwester 
 Karl-Heinz Peters as Patient mit Gipsbein 
 Willy Schultes as Pförtner 
 Klaus Hoeft as Lonis Freund 
 Georg Thomalla as Waldemar Kosel 
 Karl Spiehs as Polizist

References

Bibliography
 Bock, Hans-Michael & Bergfelder, Tim. The Concise CineGraph. Encyclopedia of German Cinema. Berghahn Books, 2009.

External links

1969 films
1969 comedy films
German comedy films
West German films
1960s German-language films
Films directed by Harald Vock
Gloria Film films
1960s German films